Adelino Manuel Lopes Amaro da Costa, GCIH (18 April 1943 – 4 December 1980) was a Portuguese Politician.

Background
Costa was a son of Civil Engineer from the Instituto Superior Técnico of the Technical University of Lisbon (Universidade Técnica de Lisboa) Manuel Rafael Amaro da Costa (b. Odemira, São Martinho das Amoreiras, January 10, 1910–), of some rural Nobility descent, and wife (m. Lisbon, 1937) Joaquina da Conceição Duarte Lopes Nunes (Odemira, Relíquias, January 22, 1914 – Lisbon, Alvalade, June 19, 1991).

Career
Like his father he was also a civil engineer by training from the Instituto Superior Técnico of the University of Lisbon.

After the Carnation Revolution, he founded, together with Diogo Freitas do Amaral, the Democratic and Social Centre (CDS), in which he became Deputy to the Assembly of the Republic and Minister.

After the victory of the Democratic Alliance, a coalition between the Social Democrats, the Popular Monarchists and his own party, in the 1980 Portuguese legislative election, he became the first civilian defence minister since the Carnation Revolution on 3 January 1980.

He died in the 1980 Camarate air crash, together with his wife Maria Manuel Simões Vaz da Silva Pires, the prime minister Francisco de Sá Carneiro and Sá Carneiro's partner, Snu Abecassis, while heading to Porto to take part in a rally for the 1981 Portuguese presidential election.

Conspiracy theorists claim he was the true target for assassination, for he had documents concerning the October surprise conspiracy theory and was planning on taking them to the United Nations's General Assembly. According to this conspiracy theory, Reagan promised to sell American weapons to Iran, to replace the old Portuguese ones; the Portuguese military were acting as middlemen (two of the Portuguese Presidential candidates, in 1980, were Generals, and one of them was promptly accused as responsible for the assassination by many Sá Carneiro supporters); a boat with the weapons was almost seized at Lisbon's harbor. This theory is reinforced with the fact that Amaro da Costa was the one renting the plane, and Sá Carneiro a last minute passenger (possibly as a decoy).

Decorations

He was decorated with the Grand Cross of the Order of Prince Henry (Ordem do Infante Dom Henrique).

Family
He married Maria Manuel Simões Vaz da Silva Pires (August 26, 1946 – Loures, Camarate, December 4, 1980), daughter of Gustavo Correia Barata da Silva Pires and wife Maria Manuela da Silva Casaleiro Simões Vaz, without issue.

He was the brother of Manuel Rafael Lopes Amaro da Costa and the brother in law of politician Roberto Carneiro.

Ancestors

References

1943 births
1980 deaths
People from Oeiras, Portugal
CDS – People's Party politicians
Ministers of National Defence of Portugal
Technical University of Lisbon alumni
Victims of aviation accidents or incidents in Portugal